Silmugi River is a river in the municipality of Borbon in Cebu province in the Philippines.

Landforms of Cebu
Rivers of the Philippines